Givat Nili (lit. Nili Hill) is a moshav in northern Israel. Located near Zikhron Ya'akov and Wadi Ara, it falls under the jurisdiction of Alona Regional Council.

History
The moshav was established in 1953 by Jewish immigrants from Iraq, Turkey and Tunisia on the land of the depopulated Palestinian village of Umm ash Shauf. It was named after the Nili underground organisation.

See also
Israeli wine

References

Iraqi-Jewish culture in Israel
Tunisian-Jewish culture in Israel
Turkish-Jewish culture in Israel
Moshavim
Populated places established in 1953
Populated places in Haifa District
1953 establishments in Israel